Arthur Gregg Sulzberger (born August 5, 1980) is an American journalist serving as chairman of The New York Times Company and publisher of its flagship newspaper, The New York Times.

Early life and education 
Sulzberger was born in Washington, D.C., on August 5, 1980, to Gail Gregg and Arthur Ochs Sulzberger Jr. He is of German ancestry. His paternal grandfather, Arthur Ochs Sulzberger, was Jewish, and the rest of his family is of Christian background (Episcopalian and Congregationalist).

He attended Ethical Culture Fieldston School and Brown University, graduating in 2003 with a major in political science. At Brown, Sulzberger worked briefly for The Brown Daily Herald as a Contributing Writer.

Career

Providence Journal
After being encouraged by Brown journalism professor Tracy Breton to apply, he interned at The Providence Journal from 2004 to 2006, working from the paper's office in Wakefield. While there, he revealed that membership of the Narragansett Lions Club was not open to women. Despite threats from the club to withdraw their advertising if the story ran, the Journal published Sulzberger's story. The club began admitting women a few months later.

The Oregonian
Sulzberger worked as a reporter for The Oregonian newspaper in Portland from 2006 to 2009, writing more than 300 pieces about local government and public life, including a series of investigative exposés on misconduct by Multnomah County Sheriff Bernie Giusto.

The New York Times
Sulzberger began writing for the New York Times as a metro reporter in February 2009, which published his first article on March 2. He became a national correspondent, heading the Kansas City bureau and covering the Midwest region. The 2017 film Kodachrome, directed by Mark Raso, is based on his 2010 article about a rural community that became the last place to develop Kodachrome film. In 2013, he was tapped by then-executive editor Jill Abramson to lead the team that produced the Times Innovation Report, an internal assessment of the challenges facing the Times in the digital age. He was the lead author of the 97-page report, which documented in "clinical detail" how the Times was losing ground to "nimbler competitors" and "called for revolutionary changes". The Innovation Report was leaked to BuzzFeed News in March 2014.

Sulzberger was named associate editor for newsroom strategy in August 2015. In that role, he was part of the group that outlined the Times plan to double the news outlet's digital revenue by 2020 and increase collaboration between departments, dubbed "Our Path Forward". In October 2016, he was named deputy publisher, putting him in line to succeed his father as publisher. His cousins Sam Dolnick, now assistant managing editor of the Times, and David Perpich, now head of standalone products and a member of the New York Times Company board, were also considered for the role.

On December 14, 2017, it was announced that Sulzberger would take over as publisher on January 1, 2018. He is the sixth member of the Ochs-Sulzberger family to serve in the role. Though The New York Times is a public company, all voting shares are controlled by the Ochs-Sulzberger Family Trust. SEC filings state the trust's "primary objective" is that the Times continues "as an independent newspaper, entirely fearless, free of ulterior influence and unselfishly devoted to the public welfare". On his first day as publisher, Sulzberger wrote an essay noting that he was taking over in a "period of exciting innovation and growth", but also a "period of profound challenge". He committed to holding the Times "to the highest standards of independence, rigor, and fairness".

As publisher, he oversees the news outlet's journalism and business operations. Sulzberger has been the principal architect of the news outlet's digital transformation and has led its efforts to become a subscriber-first business. He became publisher on January 1, 2018, succeeding his father Arthur Ochs Sulzberger Jr., although the elder Sulzberger remained chairman of The New York Times Company until the end of 2020. A.G. Sulzberger became the chairman of The New York Times Company on January 1, 2021.

Sulzberger met with President Donald Trump at the White House on July 20, 2018. The meeting was off-the-record, but after President Trump tweeted about it eight days later, Sulzberger "pushed back hard" to dispute the President's characterization of the meeting. Sulzberger said in a statement that at the meeting, he "told the president directly that I thought that his [anti-press] language was not just divisive but increasingly dangerous. I warned that this inflammatory language is contributing to a rise in threats against journalists and will lead to violence." Sulzberger met with President Trump in the Oval Office again on January 31, 2019, for an on-the-record interview with Times reporters Peter Baker and Maggie Haberman.

He has said that an independent press "is not a liberal ideal or a progressive ideal or a Democratic ideal. It's an American ideal." In 2020, Sulzberger voiced concern about the disappearance of local news, saying that "if we don't find a path forward" for local journalism, "I believe we'll continue to watch society grow more polarized, less empathetic, more easily manipulated by powerful interests and more untethered from the truth."

Personal life and family
Through his father, Sulzberger is a grandson of Arthur Ochs "Punch" Sulzberger Sr., great-grandson of Arthur Hays Sulzberger, and great-great-grandson of Adolph Ochs. In 2018, he married Molly Messick.

See also
 New Yorkers in journalism

References

External links
 

1980 births
Living people
American newspaper publishers (people)
Brown University alumni
Collegiate School (New York) alumni
Sulzberger family
The New York Times writers
The New York Times people
The Oregonian people
The Providence Journal people